Bullingdon may refer to:
 
 Bullingdon Club, a socially exclusive student dining club at Oxford University
 HM Prison Bullingdon, a Category B/C prison located in Arncott, Oxfordshire
 Bullingdon Hundred, an ancient hundred in the south-east of the county of Oxfordshire
 Bullingdon Rural District, a former local government area in Oxfordshire